MS Spero, was a British ferry ship, which was part of Ellerman Wilson's fleet. She was built by Camell Laird Shipsbuilders in 1966. She was later sold on NEL Lines as the Sappho, and was the company's first ship. She was in use from 1973 up to 2001, when she was sold to Carra and Pontikos as the Santorini 3. She was eventually sold for scrap as the Santori.

History 
The construction on the ship started in 1966. Her number was 1322 and was launched on May, while on August, she was routed between  Hull-Gothenburg-London, connecting England with Sweden,  and later between Hull-Zeebruge and Hull-Gothenburg.  On 26 April 1973 the newly founded Maritime Company of Lesvos, purchased the ship and renamed her "Sappho", after the poet with the same name. After she was purchased, she was routed between Piraeus-Chios-Mytilene, where she worked for nearly 30 years. Later, the route was expanded to Thessaloniki. On such a route, at 12:30 on 25 February 1999, her engine room caught on fire, while sailing near Karystos. As a result, she was towed to Piraeus the next day for repairs. No victims were reported. In March 2002, when she reached the 35 year limit of age which was valid then, she was sold on the Greek Carra & Pontikos (Lacerta Shipping), for 1.500.000 USD,  with a new name "Santorini 3, connecting Tanzania and Kenya.The route was found pathetic and finally, on December 2003, she was sold for scrap at Indian scrappers, as the "Santori" for her last trip.

Receptions 
During her days in Greece, she was very successful, having made 4,493 trips and carried 5,316,981 passengers. Even later, when new, more modern ships were launched on the line (such as the MS Mytilene), she was still used by passengers for their travels, as she was considered better at sea and with less vibration.

References 

Ferries of the United Kingdom
1966 ships